William Lyall (27 January 1848 – 22 April 1931) was a Scottish international rugby union player who played for Edinburgh Academicals in Edinburgh.

Born in Edinburgh in 1848 to David and Isabella Lyall, William Lyall played as a Forward.

Lyall played in the first ever rugby union international match for Scotland against England in 27 March 1871

References

1848 births
1931 deaths
Scottish rugby union players
Rugby union players from Edinburgh
Scotland international rugby union players
Edinburgh Academicals rugby union players
Rugby union forwards